K-Paul's Louisiana Kitchen was a Cajun and Creole restaurant in the French Quarter owned by Paul Prudhomme that closed in 2020.  Prudhomme and his wife Kay Hinrichs Prudhomme opened the restaurant in 1979. The restaurant is “credited with helping put New Orleans on the culinary map” and popularizing Cajun cuisine. It has also been described as one of the world’s most influential restaurants.

History
The restaurant was located in a building originally built in 1864 and in 1996, underwent extensive renovations.

When the restaurant opened, it had a 62 seat capacity.  Eventually capacity expanded to more than 200 seats and “nightly lines of enthusiastic diners from around the world.”

K-Paul’s has been described as “unpretentious from the outside but revolutionary on the inside.”

References

External links
IN THE BIG APPLE, `GOD IS CAJUN,` AND PAUL PRUDHOMME IS HIGH PRIEST

Defunct Cajun restaurants in the United States
Creole restaurants in the United States
Defunct restaurants in the United States
French Quarter
Restaurants in New Orleans